Lou Yiping is a Chinese chess International Master.

Chess career
He played in the Chess World Cup 2013, being defeated by Gata Kamsky in the first round.

References

External links 

Lou Yiping chess games at 365Chess.com

1991 births
Living people
Chinese chess players